Vehicle registration plates of Saudi Arabia are manufactured by the Government Printing Press in Riyadh. Saudi Arabia has taken action to ensure that all people residing within its borders register their vehicles in Saudi Arabia and display a rear as well as a front license plate.

The plates consist of three letters and up to four numbers in Arabic. Both letters and numbers are also translated into the Latin alphabet and into the Western Arabic numerals, respectively.
On the right side (or in the centre since 2014), the plate contains the Saudi Arabia coat of arms and the international code KSA letters written vertically (horizontally since 2014). The lower sticker is the official seal.
The standard plates always have four numbers and if necessary they are padded by zeroes. Personalised plates or earlier registrations may contain one, two or three numbers with or without zero padding.
The letter translation into the Latin alphabet is done from left to right, although Arabic letters are read from right to left. Furthermore, the translation is not always correct. There are only 17 Arabic letters used on the registration plates.

Overview
The following Arabic letters are used on Saudi registration plates.

All plates have a white background, but several vehicle types may have a different background on the Strip which contains the coat of arms, the country name abbreviation and official seal. The strip is on the right hand side for 335x155 mm (US Size) License Plate. and in the middle for 550x110mm (EU Size) License Plate. Each type of license plate also has a symbol, such as a circle or a triangle, at the bottom of the strip. The US Size is the standard in the country. However, the EU Size is available if need be.

Private Cars
The strip on the plates for Private cars is coloured white. The symbol at the bottom of the strip is a circle.

The Saudi Police uses standard registration plates.

Public Transport
The strip on the plates for public transport and taxis is colored yellow. The symbol at the bottom of the strip is a triangle pointing up.

Commercial
The strip on the plates for trucks and utility vehicles is colored blue. The symbol at the bottom of the strip is a triangle pointing down.

Temporary
The strip on the plates for trucks and utility vehicles is colored silver. The symbol at the bottom of the strip is a triangle pointing left.

Diplomatic
The strip on the plates for diplomatic vehicles is colored green. The Saudi Coat of arms is surrounded by a white rectangle. There is no symbol at the bottom of the strip.

Banned combinations 
Some letter combinations are banned, either for their Arabic or Latin translation. Among them are " 'S' 'E' 'X' ", " 'A' 'S' 'S' ", and others. The KSA combination is however allowed.

Former registration plates 
The current plates were introduced in 2006. The former registration plates prior to 1996 used only 3 numbers and 3 letters with no translation. Even older license plates had a 7-number combination assigned to them, appearing in Arabic (International) and Hindi (East Arab) numerals. Above them was written Al-Saudia, in Arabic only. Numbers were sometimes padded by zeroes.
Plates for trucks, public transport or diplomatic vehicles had a blue, yellow, or green background, respectively. The colors have been preserved in the current system, except that in the older system the entire plate had such a background.

References

External links 

 Saudi registration plates at olavsplates.com
 Saudi registration plates at worldlicenseplates.com
 Source Code of Arabic License Plate Recognition

Saudi Arabia
Road transport in Saudi Arabia
Government of Saudi Arabia
 Registration plate